Soga Seikan (1592-?) was a samurai from Joseon who served Nakagawa Hidenari, the first daimyō of Oka as a retainer.

He was born in 1592 in Joseon.

Hidenari participated in the Imjin war. In 1597, he heard crying near his camp in Suwon, and his retainer found a child by the river. The child looked so friendly that Hidenari invited him to join them. A prisoner told them that the child was the son of 曾清官 (Zeng Qing Guan), commanding officer of Joseon who led 500 soldiers, but the child's name was still unknown. Hidenari pitied the child and decided to raise him in the camp, naming him Seikan (清官), using the same character of his father.

The following year, Hidenari returned to Japan with Seikan, where he was permitted to reside in Hidenari's residence in Osaka for the next few years.

In 1601, Seikan moved Hidenari's territory, Bungo province and became Hidenari's retainer. Seikan was given the surname Soga(曾我) which resembles his father's surname, 曾. Eventually, he became Hidenari's page and was given a salary.

In 1608, he was married to the daughter of Yaishi Jinbei, former retainer of Ōtomo clan.

The details of his birth and death are unknown.

See also 
 List of foreign-born samurai in Japan

References 

People of Azuchi–Momoyama-period Japan
Foreign samurai in Japan
Japanese people of Korean descent
17th-century Korean people
People from Gyeonggi Province
1592 births
Year of death unknown
Date of birth unknown
Zainichi Korean people